Arianna Julia Freeman (born 1978) is an American lawyer from Pennsylvania who serves as a United States circuit judge of the United States Court of Appeals for the Third Circuit.

Early life and education 

Freeman was born in 1978 in Boston. She received her Bachelor of Arts, with honors, from Swarthmore College in 2001 and her Juris Doctor from Yale Law School in 2007.

Career 

Freeman served as a law clerk for Judge James T. Giles from 2007 to 2008 and Judge C. Darnell Jones II from 2008 to 2009, both on the United States District Court for the Eastern District of Pennsylvania. From 2009 to 2022, she worked at the Federal Community Defender Office including as an assistant federal defender as a research and writing specialist from 2009 to 2014 and in the Non-Capital Habeas Unit from 2014 to 2016.  From 2016 to 2022, she was a managing attorney with the Federal Community Defender office for the Eastern District of Pennsylvania in Philadelphia. From 2019 to 2021, Freeman represented Curtis Crosland, a man who was convicted and sentenced to life in prison based entirely on the statements of two witnesses who either recanted their testimony or failed to appear in court. After serving 34 years of his life sentence, Crosland was exonerated and freed.

Federal judicial service 

On January 19, 2022, President Joe Biden announced his intent to nominate Freeman  to serve as a United States circuit judge of the United States Court of Appeals for the Third Circuit. President Biden nominated Freeman to the seat vacated by Judge Theodore McKee, who on July 29, 2021, notified the White House that he intended to assume senior status upon confirmation of his successor. On January 28, 2022, following Justice Stephen Breyer's announcement of his intention to retire as an Associate Justice of the Supreme Court of the United States, Freeman was mentioned as one of the potential nominees for a Supreme Court appointment by President Joe Biden. On March 2, 2022, a hearing on her nomination was held before the Senate Judiciary Committee. During her confirmation hearing, Republican senators criticized her work as a public defender. On April 4, 2022, the committee were deadlocked on her nomination by an 11–11 vote. On June 22, 2022, the United States Senate discharged her nomination from committee by a 50–48 vote. On September 12, 2022, the Senate invoked cloture on her nomination by a 45–44 vote. On September 13, 2022, the Senate failed to confirm her nomination by a 47–50 vote. Majority Leader Chuck Schumer initially voted yes but changed his vote to no and filed a motion to reconsider the vote. Freeman was the first Biden judicial nominee to be rejected by the Senate. On September 29, 2022, her nomination was confirmed by a 50–47 vote. She received her judicial commission on October 20, 2022. She is the first African-American woman to serve on the Third Circuit.

See also 
 List of African-American federal judges
 List of African-American jurists
 Joe Biden judicial appointment controversies
 Joe Biden Supreme Court candidates

References

External links 

1978 births
Living people
21st-century American judges
21st-century American women lawyers
21st-century American lawyers
21st-century American women judges
African-American judges
African-American lawyers
African-American women lawyers
Judges of the United States Court of Appeals for the Third Circuit
Lawyers from Boston
Pennsylvania lawyers
Public defenders
Swarthmore College alumni
United States court of appeals judges appointed by Joe Biden
Yale Law School alumni